Clarkson Village is the name of three places, one in Canada and two in the United States:

Clarkson Village is in Mississauga, Ontario
Clarkson Village is in Monroe County, New York
Clarkson Village is in Orleans County, New York.